The 2020 K4 League is the first season of the K4 League as a semi-professional league and the fourth tier of South Korean football league system. After the 2019 season, the former K3 League Basic went defunct and was rebranded into the K4 League. In the 2020 season, the K4 League will consist of 13 teams with 5 teams from K3 League Advanced, 6 teams from K3 League Basic, and 2 teams newly founded in 2019. The teams for the 2020 season were announced by the Korea Football Association on 19 December 2019.

Competition format 
The 2020 K4 League is contested by thirteen teams, with no relegation system in place. Each team competes home and away, playing 24 games. The top two teams get promoted to the K3 League, while the third and the fourth placed teams qualify for the promotion play off.

Teams

League table

Results

Matches 1 to 24

Promotion play-off
The match was played on the 29th of November 2020. The 3rd and 4th placed team from the 2020 K4 League will play for a spot in the 2021 K3 League against the team placed 14th in the 2020 K3 League.

Promotion play-off

Winner

See also
 2020 Korean FA Cup
 2020 K League 1
 2020 K League 2
 2020 K3 League
 2020 K5 League
 2020 K6 League
 2020 K7 League

References

External links

K4 League seasons
2020 in South Korean football